Mussie Zerai Yosief, also known as Dr. Abba Mussie Zerai Yosief, Mosè Zerai and Dr. Father Moses, (born 1975), is a Roman Catholic priest known for his work with asylum seekers & refugees crossing the Mediterranean Sea from North Africa to Europe during the European Asylum seekers crisis.

Biography
Born in Asmara, Zerai grew up with his grandmother and seven siblings after his mother died when he was five and his father who at one point was arrested by the Secret Police fled the country to Italy.  Aged seventeen, Zerai traveled to Rome where he applied for asylum and with the aid of a British priest, obtained a residence permit.

His first years in Italy were spent doing a number of jobs including sorting newspapers and working on a fruit stand, while helping his priest as a translator and assistant, especially supporting immigrants & refugees to obtain identification, residency permits, health cards, pensions, and tax registration. 1992 - 2000

Then for three years he studied with the Scalabrinian Missionaries in Piacenza, returning to Rome in 2003 to Studie theology & work for the organization there.

In 2006, Zerai co-founded Agenzia Habeshia, an organization which works to pursue the interest of asylum seekers and refugees.

He was ordained a priest in 2010.

Since 2011, Zerai has lived in Switzerland where he is a priest for the Eritrean and Ethiopian communities. He was first placed in Fribourg and later in Erlinsbach.

The Migrant Priest https://www.voaafrica.com/a/the-migrant-priest/6775422.html https://crcc.usc.edu/father-mussie-zerai-the-migrant-priest/

In 2014 he was elected European coordinator for Eritrean Catholics and their chaplains.

In 2018 he returned to Rome to carry out the task of European coordinator and prepare the way for the appointment of the apostolic visitor for the faithful of the géèz rite in Europe, the USA and Canada.

In 2022 called to carry out pastoral service for the Italian missions in Montreal in Canada.

Awards received: - 
Giardino dei Giusti di tutto il mondo al Monte Stella - Milano https://it.gariwo.net/giornata-dei-giusti/giornata-dei-giusti-2023-25636.html

Premio per la Cultura Mediterranea 2017 https://www.fondazionecarical.it/iniziative-della-fondazione/premio-per-la-cultura-mediterranea/xi-edizione-premio-per-la-cultura-mediterranea/

Terra Justa - Fafe Portugal April 2016, https://static.cm-fafe.pt/camara-municipal-fafe/296/236385/terra-justa-programa-2016.pdf

Golden Doves for Peace - Rome Italy, June 2016, https://archiviodisarmo.it/premio-colombe-d-oro-per-la-pace.html

The 100 Most Influential People, TIME, April 2016, https://time.com/collection-post/4302419/mussie-zerai-2016-time-100/

ProAsyl award for Human Right, September 2016, http://www.proasyl.de/pressemitteilung/pro-asyl-menschenrechtspreis-geht-an-father-mussie-zerai/

CRANS Montana Forum award for Peace and Human Dignity, October 2016 https://www.cmf.ch/index.php?page=16

Mundo Negro at la Fraternidad 2017 Spain http://mundonegro.es/helena-maleno-y-mussie-zerai-estamos-cediendo-nuestra-libertad-a-cambio-de-seguridad/

One Young World Counsellor Father Mussie Zerai is a Nobel Peace Prize nominee https://www.oneyoungworld.com/counsellors/father-mussie-zerai https://www.oneyoungworld.com/news-item/one-young-world-counsellor-father-mussie-zerai-nobel-peace-prize-nominee

The Peace Research Institute Oslo nominated Zerai for the 2015 Nobel Peace Prize.

Honorary PHD 2020 Luzern University of Switzerland https://www.unilu.ch/universitaet/dienste/universitaetskommunikation/medienmitteilungen/fakultaeten-und-departement-verleihen-fuenf-ehrendoktorate-5481/

References 

1975 births
Living people
People from Asmara
Eritrean activists
Immigrant rights activists
Eritrean emigrants to Italy
Eritrean Catholic priests
21st-century Roman Catholic priests